Helena Leander (born 1982) is a Swedish Green Party politician. She has been a member of the Riksdag since 2006.

External links
Helena Leander at the Riksdag website

Members of the Riksdag from the Green Party
Living people
1982 births
Women members of the Riksdag
21st-century Swedish women politicians
Date of birth missing (living people)